Fepikou Tatafu (born 12 March 1975) is a Tongan former rugby union player. He played as wing and centre.

Career
Tatafu was first capped for Tonga during a test match against Fiji, on 27 July 1996, in Nuku'alofa. He also was part of the Tongan roster for the 1999 Rugby World Cup, playing two matches in the tournament. Tatafu last played for Tonga during a test against Papua New Guinea, on 7 December 2002, in Nuku'alofa. At club level, he played the National Provincial Championship for North Otago and later, he moved in France to play for Saint Nazaire Rugby Loire-Atlantique in Fédérale 1.

References

External links
Fepikou Tatafu at New Zealand Rugby History
Fepikou Tatafu Itsrugby.fr
Fepikou Tatafu International statistics at ESPN Scrum

1975 births
Living people
Bristol Bears players
Tonga international rugby union players
Tongan rugby union players
Tongan expatriate rugby union players
Expatriate rugby union players in France
Expatriate rugby union players in New Zealand
Tongan expatriate sportspeople in New Zealand
Tongan expatriate sportspeople in France
Rugby union centres
Rugby union wings